The chief of defence (or head of defence) is the highest ranked commissioned officer of a nation's armed forces. The acronym CHOD is in common use within NATO and the European Union as a generic term for the highest national military position within the NATO and EU member states, rather than the actual term used for individual positions. Thus, irrespective of the formal national designation of that position is some variation on Commander-in-Chief, Chief of Staff, Supreme Commander or something else, they can all be referred to unambiguously as CHODs in NATO and EU terminology, although other terms are sometimes also seen within NATO. Thus, the Chairman of the Joint Chiefs of Staff is the CHOD of the United States, the Chief of the Defence Staff is the CHOD of United Kingdom, the Inspector General of the Bundeswehr is the CHOD of Germany and the Chief of Defence (Forsvarssjefen) is the CHOD of Norway.

Both NATO and EU occasionally hold CHODs meetings of the NATO Military Committee and the European Union Military Committee respectively.

Chief of defence positions by NATO country 
Within member states of NATO, the following national positions are the CHOD positions. Sometimes more than one form of translation into English is encountered.

In 2018 Slovenia appointed the first woman Major General Alenka Ermenc to hold such a position in the history of NATO and Slovenia.

CHOD positions by non-NATO EU country 

Within the EU member states that are not members of NATO, the following national positions are the CHOD positions.

Other Chief of Defence positions by (non-NATO and non-EU) country
Note that in many countries outside of NATO and EU, the concept of civilian control of the military is inapplicable. In some countries the minister of defence is often a senior military officer. However, the list below only lists CHOD equivalents and not defense ministers.

Notes

References

External links 
 NATO Chiefs of Defence

 

Military ranks of NATO